is a drama that aired on Fuji TV. It was first broadcast in Japan from October 13, 1997 to December 22, 1997, every Monday. It enjoyed a very high rating of 30.8% and features music by Cagnet. The theme song was "Shiawase na Ketsumatsu" (幸せな結末; "A Happy Ending") by Eiichi Ohtaki.

Cast
Takuya Kimura as Katagiri Teppei
Takako Matsu as Uesugi Riko
Norika Fujiwara as Takagi Erika
Masaaki Uchino as Katagiri Soichiro
Risa Junna as Mizuhara Sanae
Ryuuta Kawabata as Yoshimoto

Characters
Katagiri Teppei is a talented advertisement designer and a playboy with an egocentric attitude and dislike for mediocrity. He starts a relationship with Riko but still misses his past girlfriend Sanae.
Uesugi Riko is a secretary who works in the same department as Teppei. Hoping to become more independent, she moved away from her family in Nagano to Tokyo. She has a lot of spirit and eventually becomes part of a love triangle.
Takagi Erika is a flight attendant and Riko's best friend. While she secretly likes Teppei, she frequently gives helpful advice to Riko to help her maintain her relationship.
Katagiri Soichiro is a prosecutor and Teppei's brother. He is very serious in his doings unlike Teppei, and thus Soichiro is his brother's role model. He was engaged to Sanae, Teppei's former girlfriend, but he meets his own past girlfriend and develops an affair with her later on in the story.
Mizuhara Sanae is a translator of Mandarin and Japanese. She was Teppei's high school sweetheart. She became engaged to his brother Soichiro, but later finds herself falling in love with Teppei again.
Yoshimoto is Teppei's high school friend, who falls in love with Riko at first sight, and is rejected by her.

Summary
Love Generation, as the title suggests, revolves around the relationship of the two young protagonists, Katagiri Teppei and Uesugi Riko, who begin as squabbling colleagues before---it seems inevitably---falling in love.

Katagiri Teppei is a talented designer, popular amongst women. Unfortunately, Teppei, who despises conformity, is forced to move from the design department to the sales department of his company as a result of his egocentric behavior. Throughout the series, he is compelled to adapt to his new working environment, which includes cutting his long hair to create a 'more professional' image. As he struggles to adjust, he meets Uesugi Riko. While she apparently does not like him at first, she eventually falls for him. At this same time, Teppei runs into his high school sweetheart, Mizuhara Sanae, whom he still has feelings for, but discovers to his surprise that she is now engaged to his older brother Soichiro. Riko is there to console him, and this eventually blooms into an awkward romance. Soon after, however, Sanae realizes she also still has feelings for Teppei, and thus creates a love triangle. To make the matter more complicated, Soichiro starts to have an affair with a past girlfriend of his own.

Symbols

Crystal apple

Teppei's apartment has many unusual items such as a Thai artifact, a 30-year-old refrigerator, and a crystal apple. The meaning of the apple is unclear—it could be the apple that tempted Eve, or it could represent the true love between Adam and Eve. Crystal is also very fragile, and shows anything seen through it upside down. The image in the apple is seen upside down for 10 of the 11 episodes; at the end of last episode, however, it is no longer upside down. The apple was also used on the album cover of Love Generation's soundtrack.

True love never runs smooth
This advertising slogan appears over and over again in the drama.  It is a version of the famous quote from Shakespeare's A Midsummer Night's Dream Act 1 Scene 1: "The course of true love never did run smooth", and characterises the relationship between Riko and Teppei, who face constant difficulties throughout. The advertisement is visible everywhere, from the local park to Teppei's 30-year-old refrigerator --- "True love never runs smooth" is the unofficial tagline of this TV series.

External links
Love Generation - The Dog Shed
SMAP Wonderland Love Generation
 Extensive plot for each episode

1997 Japanese television series debuts
1997 Japanese television series endings
Japanese drama television series
Fuji TV dramas